Georgios Papagiannis (Greek: Γιώργος Παπαγιάννης; born July 3, 1997) is a Greek professional basketball player and the team captain for Panathinaikos of the Greek Basket League and the EuroLeague. Born in Marousi, Athens, Greece, he is a 7 ft 2  in (2.20 m) tall center, with a 7 ft 6 in (2.29 m) wingspan. His nicknames are "PG", "Big Papa" and "Big George". He is also a member of the senior National Team of Greece. He was selected 13th overall in the 2016 NBA draft by the Phoenix Suns, before having his draft rights traded to the Sacramento Kings.

Early years and high school career
Papagiannis was born in Marousi, a northern suburb of Athens, Greece, and spent his early years in Megara, in the western region of Athens. Papagiannis played at the Jordan Brand Classic International Game in 2013. He announced that he was committing to Westtown School in West Chester, Pennsylvania, in May 2013. He then attended school and played basketball at Westtown, during the 2013–14 academic school year and basketball season, as a high school junior. After his junior year of high school in the United States, he transferred to the American School in Athens, Greece, for his senior year of high school.

Professional career

Peristeri (2012–2013)
Papagiannis made his senior men's club debut with Peristeri on January 5, 2012, at the age of 14, in a Greek Basket League 2011–12 season game against Panathinaikos. He became the youngest player to ever play in the modern era of the Greek Basket League (since the league first became fully professional, under the organization of HEBA, starting with the 1992–93 season). He also spent the entire 2012–13 season with Peristeri.

Panathinaikos (2014–2016)
On June 25, 2014, Papagiannis signed with Panathinaikos on a multi-year deal, yet there was a player option in the contract, which allowed him to leave Panathinaikos for a US college during the summer of 2015. Papagiannis, considered to be one of the biggest young European talent prospects, received scholarship offers from 17 USA colleges, including UConn, Arizona, Temple, NC State, Oregon, St. John's, and Kentucky. On July 8, 2015, it was announced that Papagiannis had chosen to continue playing for Panathinaikos. His Panathinaikos contract included a €500,000 euros buyout option.

Papagiannis was a member of the Panathinaikos teams that won both the 2015 edition and the 2016 edition of the Greek Cup. He also played in six games with Panathinaikos during the 2015–16 EuroLeague season competition, where he averaged 1.5 points and 1.7 rebounds per game, in 5 minutes per game. In the 2015–16 Greek League season, he averaged 6.5 points and 2.8 rebounds per game, in 11.5 minutes per game, in 23 games played.

Sacramento Kings (2016–2018)
In April 2016, Papagiannis entered the 2016 NBA draft, and was projected as a mid-to-late second round pick, but he also garnered interest as a late first round pick. However, on June 23, Papagiannis was selected with the 13th overall pick by the Phoenix Suns, becoming the highest drafted Greek player ever. His rights were later traded to the Sacramento Kings on draft night, and in July, he joined the Kings for the 2016 NBA Summer League. On July 15, 2016, he signed his rookie scale contract with the Kings. On November 5, 2016, he made his NBA debut in a 117–91 loss to the Milwaukee Bucks, recording two points and one rebound in six minutes off the bench. On March 18, 2017, he had his first double-double with 14 points and 11 rebounds in the Kings' 110–94 loss to the Oklahoma City Thunder. During his rookie season, he had multiple assignments with the Reno Bighorns of the NBA Development League.

On February 8, 2018, Papagiannis was waived by the Kings.

Portland Trail Blazers (2018)
On March 8, 2018, Papagiannis signed a 10-day contract with the Portland Trail Blazers. Despite not playing a single game for Portland at the end of his 10-day contract, Papagiannis signed a two-year contract on March 18. He appeared in one game with the Blazers. Papagiannis was waived by the Blazers after the end of the 2018 NBA Summer League.

Return to Panathinaikos (2018–present) 
On July 20, 2018, Papagiannis officially returned to Panathinaikos, after signing a contract with the team for 5 years, with the last 2 years of the contract being team options. The contract also included an NBA opt-out option, after the third year of the contract.

National team career

Greek junior national team
With the Greek Under-16 junior national team, Papagiannis played at the 2012 FIBA Europe Under-16 Championship, which he led in blocks per game. He also played with Greece at the 2013 TBF Under-16 World Cup in Sakarya, Turkey, where he helped Greece win the gold medal. He also played at the 2013 FIBA Europe Under-16 Championship, where he won the bronze medal and was named to the All-Tournament Team, after leading the tournament in blocks per game.

Papagiannis also played at the 2015 FIBA Under-19 World Cup, and the 2015 FIBA Europe Under-18 Championship, where he was voted to the All-Tournament Team.

Greek senior national team
Papagiannis became a member of the senior Greek national basketball team in 2017. He played with Greece at the EuroBasket 2017, and at the 2019 FIBA World Cup qualification.

Career statistics

NBA

Regular season

|-
| align="left" | 
| align="left" | Sacramento
| 22 || 0 || 16.1 || .549 || .000 || .857 || 3.9 || .9 || .1  || .8 || 5.6
|-
| align="left" | 
| align="left" | Sacramento
| 16 || 0 || 7.4 || .415 || .000 || .000 || 2.3 || .6 || .1  || .4 || 2.1
|- class="sortbottom"
| align="left" | 
| align="left" | Portland
| 1 || 0 || 4.0 || 1.000 || .000 || .000 || 1.0 || .0 || 2.0  || .0 || 2.0
|- class="sortbottom"
| style="text-align:center;" colspan=2| Career
| 39 || 0 || 12.2 || .514 || .000 || .857 || 3.2 || .7 || .2  || .6 || 4.1

European Leagues

|-
| style="text-align:left;"| 2015–16
| align="left" | Panathinaikos
| EuroLeague
| 6 ||  5.0 || .308 || .000 || .500 || 1.7 || .0 || .0 || .3 || 1.5 
|-
| style="text-align:left;"| 2018–19
| align="left" | Panathinaikos
| EuroLeague
| 26 || 12.1 || .694 || .000 || .556 || 2.8 || .2 || .3 || .6 || 4.0 
|-
| style="text-align:left;"| 2019–20
| align="left" | Panathinaikos
| EuroLeague
| 27 || 17.5 || .620 || .000 || .667 || 4.7 || .2 || .4 || .9 || 6.9
|-
| style="text-align:left;"| 2020–21
| align="left" | Panathinaikos
| Greek Basket League
| 31 || 21.4 || .634 || .000 || .814 || 5.7 || 1.0 || .6 || 1.3 || 10.2
|-
| style="text-align:left;"| 2020–21
| align="left" | Panathinaikos
| EuroLeague
| 32 || 21.9 || .652 || .125 || .667 || 5.4 || 1.0 || .3 || 1.6 || 8.8
|-
|-class=sortbottom
| align="center" colspan=2 | Career
| All Leagues
| 122 || 17.9 || .637 || .071 || .711 || 4.6 || .6 || .4 || 1.1 || 7.4

Awards and accomplishments

Club career
3× Greek League Champion: (2019, 2020, 2021)
4× Greek Cup Winner: (2015, 2016, 2019, 2021)
3× Greek League All-Star: (2019, 2020, 2022)
Greek All-Star Game Slam Dunk Contest Winner: (2020)

Greek junior national team
2012 FIBA Europe Under-16 Championship: Blocked Shots Leader
2013 TBF Under-16 World Cup: 
2013 FIBA Europe Under-16 Championship: 
2013 FIBA Europe Under-16 Championship: All-Tournament Team
2013 FIBA Europe Under-16 Championship: Blocked Shots Leader
2015 FIBA Europe Under-18 Championship: , All-Tournament Team

References

External links

 Official website 
 Georgios Papagiannis  at dleague.nba.com
 Georgios Papagiannis at draftexpress.com
 Georgios Papagiannis at esake.gr 
 Georgios Papagiannis at basket.gr 
 Georgios Papagiannis at euroleague.net
 Georgios Papagiannis at fiba.com

1997 births
Living people
2019 FIBA Basketball World Cup players
Centers (basketball)
Greek Basket League players
Greek expatriate basketball people in the United States
Greek men's basketball players
National Basketball Association players from Greece
Panathinaikos B.C. players
Peristeri B.C. players
Phoenix Suns draft picks
Portland Trail Blazers players
Reno Bighorns players
Sacramento Kings players
Basketball players from Athens
Westtown School alumni